Wyoming Highway 51 (WYO 51) is a  long east-west Wyoming state highway located in Campbell and Crook Counties, between Gillette and Moorcroft.

Route description

Wyoming Highway 51 travels from the eastern outskirts of Gillette at an interchange with I-90/US 14/US 16 (Exit 128) and the eastern terminus of I-90 BUS east to the town of Moorcroft. Highway 51 travels east, passing through the communities of Wyodak and Rozet, south of the Campbell County fairgrounds , coal mines, and south of Wyodak power plant. Wyoming 51 is the old alignment for US 14/US 16; and for most of its length closely parallels Interstate 90 which carries US 14/US 16. WYO 51 comes to an end at just under 25 miles at US 14/US 16/I-90 BUS.

WYO 51 is signed as a secondary state highway, but not marked from the Interstate 90 interchanges like most secondary state highway frontage roads.

History
Wyoming Highway 51 is the original alignment of US Route 14 and US Route 16. With the construction of Interstate 90, US 14 and US 16 were realigned onto that highway.

Major intersections

See also

References

 Official 2003 State Highway Map of Wyoming

External links

 Wyoming State Routes 000-099
 WYO 51 - I-90 Bus/US 14/US 16 to I-90/I-90 Bus/US 14/US 16
 City of Gillette website
 Town of Moorcroft website
 Campbell County Fair

Transportation in Campbell County, Wyoming
Transportation in Crook County, Wyoming
051
U.S. Route 14
U.S. Route 16